SCI Consulting Inc is  a woman-owned Federal IT services company known for servicing the U.S Federal government,  United States Coast Guard (USCG), Homeland Security (DHS), Department of Energy (DOE), Environmental Protection Agency (EPA) with Partnerships  with large SI integrators, SAIC, CSRA, Unisys and others.

History
SCI Consulting was founded in 1983 as a result of its owner Lynette Spano rejecting a job offer by Microsoft when Microsoft was only 15 employees. The company has its headquarters in Fairfax, Virginia. For over 34 years, SCI has been a contractor for the US Federal government.

Products and services
SCI Consulting provides information technology applications and management systems support, as well as business and infrastructure management services with particular focus on critical federal infrastructure projects.

See also
 Management consulting

References

Management consulting firms of the United States
Consulting firms established in 1983
Companies based in Virginia
1983 establishments in the United States
1983 establishments in Virginia
Companies established in 1983